Clavus infuscatus is a species of sea snail, a marine gastropod mollusk in the family Drilliidae.

Description
The shell grows to a length of 18 mm.

Distribution
This species occurs in the Gulf of Aqaba.

References

 Kilburn, R.N.; Dekker, H. (2008). New species of turrid conoideans (Gastropoda, Conoidea) from the Red Sea and Arabia. Basteria, 72(1-3), 1-19

External links
 

infuscatus
Gastropods described in 2008